Sir John Hugh Williams  (born 23 September 1939), generally known as Hugh Williams, is a former president of the New Zealand Electoral Commission and a retired judge of the High Court of New Zealand. From 2016 to 2022 he was Chief Justice of the Cook Islands.

Early life
Williams was educated at Wellington College and Gisborne Boys' High School, and graduated with an LLM (Hon) degree from Victoria University of Wellington.

Career
Williams was appointed a Queen's Counsel in 1988 and a High Court Justice in 1997. He was the Senior Puisne Judge and was a Master (Associate Judge) of the High Court for 6 previous years.  He was the longest serving Judge based at the High Court of New Zealand at Auckland for many years, until he retired on 22 September 2009.

Williams was the Criminal List Judge for Auckland, and presided over many high-profile trials, including the 2007 trials of Darin Gardner and Roger Kahui.

Williams was Chancellor of Massey University from 1990 to 1997, and a city councillor for Palmerston North City from 1983 to 1989. He is a former president of the New Zealand Law Society, and a current trustee of the Kea Conservation Trust. In 2009, he was appointed president of the Electoral Commission and succeeded Andrew McGechan. In 2010, he became chair of the new Electoral Commission.

After serving from 2009 as a Cook Islands High Court judge he was appointed in 2016 Chief Justice of the Cook Islands. He retired as Chief Justice in December 2022 and was replaced by Patrick Keane.

Honours

Williams was conferred an honorary doctorate (DLit) by Massey University in 1998. In the 2010 Queen's Birthday Honours, Williams was appointed an Additional Knight Companion of the New Zealand Order of Merit, for services as a judge.

References

Living people
1939 births
New Zealand jurists
High Court of New Zealand judges
New Zealand King's Counsel
20th-century King's Counsel
Victoria University of Wellington alumni
People educated at Gisborne Boys' High School
Chancellors of Massey University
Knights Companion of the New Zealand Order of Merit
People educated at Wellington College (New Zealand)
Chief justices of the Cook Islands